Mount St. Joseph Abbey is an abbey of the Trappist branch of the Cistercians located in County Offaly, near Roscrea, County Tipperary in Ireland.

The abbey was founded in 1878 by a group of 32 monks from Mount Melleray Abbey, County Waterford, a number of years earlier Arthur John Moore MP of Co. Tipperary visited Mt Melleray petitioning for it. The church was opened for worship in 1883, on 600 acres in Mount Heaton, Roscrea, and a Boarding school - Cistercian College, Roscrea - was founded in 1905. The first superior was Dom Athanasius O'Donovan (born Daniel O'Donovan).

Mount St. Joseph contains several stained glass windows created by Harry Clarke or his studios. Three windows in the infirmary, three later windows in the chapel of the college and a 1960s window dedicated to St. Patrick for the abbey church.

Three foundations have been made from Mount Saint Joseph - Nunraw (Scotland)  in 1946, Tarrawarra (Australia) in 1954, and Bolton Abbey, Moone, (County Kildare) in 1964.

The Nationalist, Home Rule supporting MP the Catholic, Count Arthur John Moore who donated the six hundred-acre property, and buildings to the Cistercians, where the Abbey and College is, is buried in Mount St Josephs.

Abbots

Dom Athanasius Donovan (Prior)
Dom Camillus Beardwood (1887)
Dom Justin McCarthy (1911)
Dom Camillus Claffey (1944)
Dom Eugene Boylan (1962)
Dom Colmcille O'Toole (1964-2000)
Dom Laurence Walsh (2000)
Dom Kevin Daly
Dom Richard Purcell (2009-2017) - became Abbot of Mount Melleray
Dom Malachy Thompson (Superior)

See also
Cistercian College, Roscrea
Trappists
Cistercians
List of monastic houses in County Offaly

References

External links
Mount St. Joseph Abbey - official website.
Cistercian College, Roscrea - official website.

Trappist monasteries in the Republic of Ireland
Cistercian monasteries in the Republic of Ireland
Religious organizations established in 1878
Religious buildings and structures in County Tipperary
1878 establishments in Ireland
1878 in Ireland